Olmec Head, Number 8 is a  tall outdoor colossal head sculpture on the east side of the north entrance to the Field Museum of Natural History in Chicago, Illinois, that was created by Mexican sculptor Ignacio Pérez Solano (b. 1931) and installed in 2000. It is one of several reproductions of San Lorenzo Colossal Head 8, which is currently located at the Museum of Anthropology in Xalapa, Veracruz.

See also
 List of public art in Chicago
 Olmec colossal heads
 Olmec Head Replica, Salt Lake City

References

External Links
 Listing on the Chicago Park District website

2000 establishments in Illinois
Outdoor sculptures in Chicago
Stone sculptures in the United States
Heads in the arts